Plain Dirt Fashion is the fifteenth studio album by American country folk group Nitty Gritty Dirt Band, released in 1984 by the record label Warner Bros. Records.  This album went to #8 on the US Country charts. The three singles from this album all charted in the top 3. "Long Hard Road (The Sharecropper's Dream)" went to 1, "I Love Only You" went to 3, and "High Horse" went to 2. The album is noteworthy for covers of both Meat Loaf's 1978 hit "Two Out of Three Ain't Bad" and Bruce Springsteen's 1981 single "Cadillac Ranch".

Track listing

Personnel
Jeff Hanna – guitars and vocals
Jimmy Ibbotson – bass, guitars, mandolin, vocals
Jimmie Fadden – drums and harmonica
Bob Carpenter – keyboards and vocals
John McEuen – guitars, mandolin, fiddle, banjo and lap steel

Additional musicians
Bass – Joe Osborn, Larry Paxton
Drums – Eddie Bayers, James Stroud
Keyboards – Dennis Burnside
Acoustic guitar – Paul Worley, Steve Gibson
Electric guitar – Paul Worley, Steve Gibson, Reggie Young
Fiddle – Ricky Skaggs, Mark O'Connor, Blain Sprouse
Dobro – Jerry "Flux" Douglas
Steel guitar – Sonny Garrish

Production
Producer – Marshall Morgan and Paul Worley for Morley Productions

Charts

Weekly charts

Year-end charts

References
All information is from the album liner notes unless otherwise noted.

1984 albums
Nitty Gritty Dirt Band albums
Warner Records albums